was Japanese professional baseball catcher and manager in the Nippon Professional Baseball. He was elected to the Japanese Baseball Hall of Fame in 2001.

References

External links
Baseball reference

1926 births
1999 deaths
Baseball people from Ibaraki Prefecture
Hosei University alumni
Japanese Baseball Hall of Fame inductees
Japanese baseball players
Nippon Professional Baseball catchers
Managers of baseball teams in Japan
Hiroshima Toyo Carp managers
Seibu Lions managers
Fukuoka SoftBank Hawks managers